Lac de Bettaniella is a lake in Corsica, France. At an elevation of 2321 m, its surface area is 0.075 km². In French, it is sometimes alternatively (and abusively) known as Lac de Bellebone or Lac du Rotondo. It is the largest lake in Corsica.

References

Lakes of Haute-Corse
Bettaniella
 is that a jojo reference?????